Cilix depalpata is a moth in the family Drepanidae first described by Strand in 1911. It is found in Afghanistan and Pakistan.

References

Moths described in 1911
Drepaninae